At the third edition of the annual Four Hills Tournament in Germany and Austria, Hemmo Silvennoinen became the first ski jumper to win the tournament without winning any of the single events. He won ahead of two other Finns.

Participating nations and athletes

Defending champion Olaf Bjørnstad did not compete. The winner of the inaugural tournament, Sepp Bradl did compete and ended up fourth overall, in spite of disappointing results on the German hills (15th and 12th).

The following athletes are on the FIS record, although it is likely incomplete.

Results

Oberstdorf
 Schattenbergschanze, Oberstdorf
30 December 1954

Garmisch-Partenkirchen
 Große Olympiaschanze, Garmisch-Partenkirchen
01 January 1955

Innsbruck
 Bergiselschanze, Innsbruck
06 January 1954

After two consecutive victories, Aulis Kallakorpi only finished twentieth in Innsbruck, falling back in the overall ranking. Winner Ruste, similarly, was missing a competitive result from Garmisch-Partenkirchen. Thus, Hemmo Silvennoinen took the overall lead, only 1.5 points ahead of Eino Kirjonen.

Bischofshofen
 Paul-Ausserleitner-Schanze, Bischofshofen
08 January 1954

Final ranking

References

External links
 FIS website
 Four Hills Tournament web site

Four Hills Tournament
1954 in ski jumping
1955 in ski jumping